Virgilio Lobregat (23 May 1901 – 30 August 1944) was a Filipino sportsman best known as a football player. He competed for the Philippines national football team at the Far Eastern Games. During World War II, he fought the Japanese as a guerrilla under Juan Miguel Elizalde, and was beheaded in August 1944 along with Elizalde and 70 other prisoners at the Manila North Cemetery.

Early life and education
Lobregat was born in Spain on 23 May 1901 and moved with his family to the Philippine Islands in 1904.

Lobregat first attended the La Salle Nozaleda in second grade. He graduated from La Salle high school in 1918.

Sporting career

Football
Lobregat is often regarded as the best Filipino player in the pre-World War II period after Paulino Alcántara. He played for the Bohemians helping the club win the National Open Championship five times. He was still in his teenage years when he first became part of the club. He also played for the Manila Nomads and Casino Español de Manila, and later for the Philippines national team at the 1925 Far Eastern Games.

Others
Aside from football he also played basketball as a  center and played baseball as well as a home run batter. He was also a track and field athlete and competed as a long-distance runner and high jumper. He also won the pentathlon and decathlon events during the initial years of the Philippine Amateur Track and Field Federation.

Other involvements
Lobregat became a member of the De La Salle Alumni Association in 1920 and served as its president from 1930 to 1932 At some point in his life he would become the Vice President of the Elizalde Group of Companies, a post he would serve until his death.

World War II, death and legacy
He fought the Japanese during World War II as a guerrilla under Juan Miguel Elizalde. Lobregat also served as a spy. He was detained at Fort Santiago by the Japanese as a prisoner of war and was beheaded in August 1944. along with Elizalde and 70 other prisoners at the Manila North Cemetery. According to his grave also at the same cemetery, Lobregat died on 30 August 1944.

Lobregat along with basketball player Jacinto Cruz and swimmer Teofilo Yldefonso was named Outstanding Athletes of Half-A-Century by the Philippine Amateur Athletic Federation. He was also named as the "Football Player of the Half Century" in the 1970s by the Philippine Football Association. A football field in Makati where a statue of Benigno Aquino Jr. is situated, and  the Lobregat Cup, a football tournament held from the late 1940s to 1970s was named in honor of him.

References

External links
 

1901 births
1944 deaths
Filipino footballers
Philippines international footballers
Association football forwards
Bohemian S.C. players
Filipino decathletes
Filipino people of Spanish descent
Filipino business executives
Businesspeople from Metro Manila
Filipino military personnel of World War II
Filipino prisoners of war
Deaths by firearm in the Philippines
People murdered in the Philippines
De La Salle University alumni
Burials at the Manila North Cemetery
People executed by Japanese occupation forces
Filipino military personnel killed in World War II
World War II prisoners of war held by Japan
Filipino guerrillas